Osage Township is an inactive township in Miller County, in the U.S. state of Missouri.

Osage Township took its name from the Osage River.

References

Townships in Missouri
Townships in Miller County, Missouri